the show with zefrank was a web video show by Ze Frank produced each weekday from March 17, 2006 until March 17, 2007. The format of the program combined commentary on media and current events with viewer contributions and activities. It is considered one of the most influential series in the history of vlogging because of its pioneering nature and for inspiring many of the elements which now define the genre. It also inspired many of today's most popular vloggers, including the Vlogbrothers, Philip DeFranco and Wheezy Waiter. It was the subject of articles in Slate, The New York Times, the Los Angeles Times, The Guardian, and Newsweek.

Format
The show ran two to three minutes in length. Topics ranged from serious socio-political commentary to absurdist comedy and running gags. One such gag was to open episodes with outlandish skits, followed by the question "Are the new viewers gone yet?"  He also performed original songs to emphasize a point or concept.

Thousands of photos, videos and music files were contributed by the audience, including over 1,000 photos in one 20-hour period.  Viewer feedback from a previous show, a segment he called "S-s-s-somethin' from the comments," often served as a launching point to a new topic.  One episode was scripted by thousands of viewers using a wiki.

On the May 16, 2006 episode, Ze challenged his viewers to create an "Earth Sandwich." The goal was to place two pieces of bread on the ground at points directly opposite each other on the globe, creating a giant sandwich between the two pieces of bread. The task was completed by brothers Duncan and Jon Rawlinson in Spain and Morgan in New Zealand.

Ending
The show concluded on March 17, 2007, as planned. Ze's final words to his viewers were "thanks so much for an amazing year."

Ze did a five-year 'replay' podcast in 2011 where he posted commentary while watching episodes of 'the show'. Episodes of this podcast are no longer available online.

See also 
 a show with Ze Frank

References

External links
 the show with zefrank
 Earth Sandwich
 a show with ze frank

2006 web series debuts
2007 web series endings
Video blogs
American non-fiction web series
American news websites
Video podcasts